The Ruger 77/22 is a bolt-action rimfire rifle chambered for the .22 Long Rifle, .22 WMR, or .22 Hornet. It has a removable rotary magazine which allows the magazine to fit flush with the bottom of the stock. The 77/22 was introduced in 1983 and was based on the centerfire Model 77 Mark II. Each rifle comes with scope rings and a lock.

Variants

77/17
The Ruger 77/17 uses the same rotary magazine design with a short bolt stroke and three position safety but is chambered in .17 HMR, .17 Winchester Super Magnum and .17 Hornet. Unlike other models, the 77/17 does not have sights.

77/22
The 77/22 comes in multiple different configurations and can be chambered for .22 LR, .22 WMR and .22 Hornet. All models come without sights and are either alloy steel (if blued) or stainless steel.

77/357
The Ruger 77/357 uses the same rotary magazine design with a short bolt stroke and three position safety but is chambered in .357 Magnum. It features an adjustable rear sight and a gold bead front sight.

77/44

Introduced in 1997, the Ruger 77/44 uses the same rotary magazine design with a short bolt stroke and three position safety but is chambered in .44 Magnum.

Notes

External links
Sturm, Ruger, and Co., Inc. Official Website
Sturm, Ruger, and Co., Inc. Official 77-Series Page
Sturm, Ruger, and Co., Inc. Official Instruction Manuals and Product History

Bolt-action rifles of the United States
77 22
.22 LR rifles
.357 Magnum firearms
.44 Magnum firearms
Rotary magazine firearms